120 King Street West is a 14-storey high-rise office building in Hamilton, Ontario, Canada. The 62 metre building was completed in 1983, and is part of the Lloyd D. Jackson Square complex. The building was originally named the Standard Life Centre, after the Standard Life Assurance Company of Canada, one of the companies responsible for the development of the Jackson Square complex.

Description
The building's facade consists of alternating horizontal rows of concrete, and glass windows. The corners of the facade are clad entirely with glass. The interior features a large lobby with granite walls and columns, a security desk, a digital directory, and 2 elevator banks. The low-rise elevator bank, located on the east side of the lobby, features 4 modernized Schindler elevators that serve floors 1 through 6, with one of the elevators serving the underground parking lot. The high-rise elevator bank, located on the West side of the lobby, also features 4 modernized Schindler elevators that serve floors 7 through 11, with one of the elevators serving the underground parking lot, as well as the mechanical floor. All of the elevators from both banks serve the plaza level. The building also features escalators and stairs that lead from the main level (lobby and mall) to the plaza level. The interior of 120 King Street West features a large central atrium with a fountain at its base, as well as column-free floor plates. The Jackson Square mall, as well as the 3 other office buildings in the complex are accessible from the lobby level. The building features a large common underground parking lot with a capacity of 1300 vehicles.

Images

See also
Lloyd D. Jackson Square
100 King Street West
1 James Street North
Robert Thomson Building
List of tallest buildings in Hamilton, Ontario

References

Buildings and structures in Hamilton, Ontario
Modernist architecture in Canada
Office buildings completed in 1983